Joseph Kofi Amankwah is a Ghanaian politician and member of the first parliament of the second republic of Ghana representing the Wenchi West constituency under the membership of the Progress Party.

Early life and education 
Amankwah was born in 1934. He attended  School of Social Welfare, Accra   where he obtained his G.C.E Advance level  Certificate in Social Work and Probation Services. He worked as a social worker before going into parliament.

Politics 
Amankwah was nominated candidate for the Progress Party (PP)  to represent  Wenchi West  constituency prior to the commencement of the 1969 Ghanaian parliamentary election. He assumed office as a member of the first parliament of the second republic of Ghana on 1 October 1969 after being pronounced winner at the 1969 Ghanaian parliamentary election. His tenure of office  as a member of parliament ended on 13 January 1972.

Personal life 
Amankwah is a Christian.

References 

1934 births
People from Brong-Ahafo Region
Ghanaian MPs 1969–1972
Living people